Stadion Druzhba was built in the late 1950s. Donations amounting to about 87 million BGN covered the construction costs. The stadium was officially opened on September 25, 1960. The first match was between the teams of Dobrudzha Dobrich and the Romanian side Progresul București, which ended with 0–1 loss for the hosts. The capacity of the stadium is 12,500 seats.

Technical data 
 Capacity: 12,500 seated
 Seat distribution:
- 4 stands
- 10 sectors
- 2 official boxes
- 5 entrances
 Field dimensions: 100 m x 65 m
 Floodlight: None

References 

Football venues in Bulgaria
Buildings and structures in Dobrich Province
Dobrich